Reuben John Reid (16 January 1903 – 31 July 1987) was an Australian rules footballer who played with Richmond in the Victorian Football League (VFL).

Recruited from Latrobe in Northern Tasmania, Reid was a centre-half-back whose career at Richmond was interrupted by a broken leg. During the 1926 season he transferred to VFA side Brunswick and he later played and coached the Tramways team and worked as a tram driver.

Notes

External links 

1903 births
1987 deaths
Australian rules footballers from Tasmania
Latrobe Football Club players
Richmond Football Club players
Brunswick Football Club players